Asterix Avo is a Belgian women's volleyball club based in Kieldrecht (Beveren).

By the end of the 1980s, the team climbed to the highest level of women's volleyball in Belgium. The club won its first trophy in 1996, when Datovoc Tongeren was defeated in the Belgian cup final.

A highlight in the history of Asterix Kieldrecht was the 2001 CEV Top Teams Cup victory against the Austrian club Telekom Post Wien.

Previous names
The club have competed under the following names:
 Asterix Kieldrecht (1969–2016)
 Asterix Avo (2016–present)

Honours

National competitions
  Belgian Championship: 11
1997–98, 1999–00, 2000–01, 2007–08, 2009–10, 2010–11, 2011–12, 2013–14, 2014–15, 2015–16, 2016–17

  Belgian Cup: 14
1995–96, 1997–98, 1998–99, 2000–01, 2001–02, 2005–06, 2006–07, 2007–08, 2009–10, 2010–11, 2013–14, 2014–15, 2015–16, 2016–17

  Belgian Supercup: 9
1999–00, 2001–02, 2004–05, 2005–06, 2007–08, 2009–10, 2011–12, 2013–14, 2015–16

International competitions
  Top Teams Cup: 1
2000–01

Team squad
Season 2016–2017, as of January 2017.

References

External links
Official site 
Official site until 2016 

 

Belgian volleyball clubs